Lodenwalke Ramsau am Dachstein is a traditional textile company located in Ramsau am Dachstein town, Austria founded in 1434.

It is the oldest business enterprise in Styria and tourists can see various machines over 200 years old.

See also 
List of oldest companies

References

External links 
Homepage
Location on Google Maps

Textile industry of Austria
Companies established in the 15th century
15th-century establishments in Austria
Economy of Styria